Hypericum lloydii, known as Lloyd's St. John's-wort or sandhill St. John's wort, is a species of flowering plant in the St. John's wort family (Hypericaceae). It is native to the Southeastern United States where it is found primarily in the lower Piedmont and inner Coastal Plain. Its natural habitat is in dry open areas such as sandhills or granite flatrocks.

Hypericum lloydii is a low straggling mat-forming shrub.

References

lloydii
Flora of the Southeastern United States
Plants described in 1962